The Man from Chinnamasta is a novel published in 2005 and written by Indira Goswami, who was awarded the Sahitya Akademi Award in 1983, the Jnanpith Award in 2001 and the Prince Claus Awards in 2008. Set in pre-independence British Assam, it was written with a specific political vision : to exhort her readers to protest against the practice of animal sacrifice in the ancient Kamakhya Temple in Assam. Once published, it took Assam by storm because of its subversive nature. The Brahmins especially took offence for her frank demand to remove an ancient practice in the most important Shakti temple of the world.

Plot
The novel follows the relationship of Dorothy Brown, a British woman in Assam, and her relationship with a tantric of the Kamakhya Temple in Assam. Ratnadhar and Bidhibala's -the child widow's- story runs parallel to this narrative. Ratnadhar organizes a signature campaign against the practice and faces many troubles in the process.

Significance
The novel is also a scholarly account of Indira Goswami's quest and hard work. The Man from Chinnamasta, the tantric who is the protagonist, constantly discusses the ancient Sanskrit scriptures and substantiates his demand to stop animal sacrifice. He demonstrates the various alternatives that Debi Bhagavat, Yogini Tantra and Kalika Purana furnish to animal sacrifice.

See also
Assamese literature
Pages Stained With Blood

References

External links
 Struggle for change (review)

Assamese literature
2005 Indian novels
Novels set in Assam